Angela Iannotta (born 22 March 1971) is an Italian Australian soccer coach and former player. As a forward, she represented Australia women's national association football team in the 1995 and 1999 FIFA Women's World Cups and played club football in Australia, Italy and Japan. Iannotta's equaliser against China in 1995 was Australia's first ever World Cup goal.

Iannotta played alongside Italy's Carolina Morace in Agliana's 1994–95 Scudetto winning team. In 1996–97 Iannotta joined Cheryl Salisbury and Sunni Hughes at Panasonic Bambina of Japan's L. League. Two broken legs, sustained seven months apart, derailed Iannotta's progress in Japan and she returned to Italy. In 1998 she accepted a place on the Australian Institute of Sport Football Program, ahead of the following year's World Cup in the United States.

References

External links
 
 Profile at Football.it

1971 births
Living people
Australian women's soccer players
Australian people of Italian descent
Australian expatriate sportspeople in Japan
Australian expatriate sportspeople in Italy
Australian expatriate women's soccer players
Serie A (women's football) players
1995 FIFA Women's World Cup players
1999 FIFA Women's World Cup players
Sportswomen from Victoria (Australia)
Speranza Osaka-Takatsuki players
Nadeshiko League players
Expatriate women's footballers in Italy
Expatriate women's footballers in Japan
Australia women's international soccer players
Women's association football forwards
People from Myrtleford